Patrick Sharp (born December 27, 1981) is a Canadian former professional ice hockey player who played 15 seasons in the National Hockey League (NHL) for the Philadelphia Flyers, Chicago Blackhawks and Dallas Stars. After his retirement as a player, Sharp joined NBC Sports as an studio analyst. He works with NBC Sports Chicago to provide color commentary for Blackhawks broadcasts. Sharp was also a member of the University of Vermont coaching staff in 2021. 

Sharp played collegiate hockey at the University of Vermont before he was drafted by the Flyers in 2001. He began his NHL career with the Flyers organization, but was traded to the Blackhawks in 2005. He became a three-time Stanley Cup champion with the Blackhawks in 2010, 2013 and 2015. He was later traded to the Stars in 2015, where he spent two seasons before returning to the Blackhawks in 2017. Sharp also represented Canadian national team at the 2014 Winter Games, where he won an Olympic Gold medal.

Playing career

Junior and college
Sharp began his hockey career in Thunder Bay, Ontario, playing first for the Thunder Bay Kings program then for the former Thunder Bay Flyers of the United States Hockey League (USHL). From there, he continued his hockey career in the college ranks with the University of Vermont, before the Philadelphia Flyers selected him in the third round, 95th overall, of the 2001 NHL Entry Draft.

Professional

Philadelphia Flyers

After completing two years with Vermont, Sharp signed an entry level contract with the Flyers on May 21, 2002, eventually making his NHL debut in 2003–04, splitting the season between the Flyers and their American Hockey League (AHL) affiliate, the Philadelphia Phantoms, recording seven points (5 goals, 2 assists) in 41 regular season games with the Flyers, and 29 points (15 goals, 14 assists) in 35 games for the Phantoms. Due to the 2004–05 NHL lockout, Sharp spent the entire following season in the AHL with the Phantoms, registering 23 goals and 29 assists (52 points) in 75 regular-season games and eight goals and 13 assists (21 points) in 21 playoff games en route to a Calder Cup championship.

Chicago Blackhawks
Midway through the 2005–06 season, on December 5, 2005, Sharp was traded by the Flyers (along with Éric Meloche) to the Chicago Blackhawks in exchange for Matt Ellison and a third-round pick in the 2006 NHL Entry Draft. He finished the season with a combined 31 points between the two teams. Sharp emerged with the Blackhawks in 2007–08, recording career-highs of 36 goals, 26 assists and 62 points. He led the Blackhawks in power play goals (9), shorthanded goals (7) and game-winning goals (7). Near the half-way mark for the season, on January 17, 2008, Sharp signed a new, four-year contract with the Blackhawks lasting through to the end of the 2011–12 season.

At the start of the 2008–09 season, on October 8, 2008, Sharp was named an alternate captain for the Blackhawks, along with Duncan Keith. Despite being limited by injuries, Sharp helped the Blackhawks form a highly offensive and young core led by second-year forwards Jonathan Toews, Patrick Kane and newly acquired defenceman Brian Campbell. He finished the season with 44 points in 61 games. He added 11 points in the 2009 playoffs as the Blackhawks were eliminated in the Western Conference Finals by the Detroit Red Wings.

On June 9, 2010, Sharp won the Stanley Cup with Chicago over the Philadelphia Flyers, his former team. He contributed 11 goals and 11 assists during Chicago's 2010 playoff run.

On January 30, 2011, Sharp was named the Most Valuable Player in the 2011 NHL All-Star Game, earning one goal and two assists in the game. On August 3, 2011, he signed a new five-year contract with Chicago worth $29.5 million, which came into effect for the 2012–13 season and carried an annual salary cap hit of $5.9 million. On September 12, 2011, Sharp underwent an emergency appendectomy after experiencing abdominal discomfort. Team physician Dr. Michael Terry anticipated that Sharp would have a full recovery in about three-to-four weeks.

On November 25, 2011, in a 6–5 win against the Anaheim Ducks, Sharp scored his second career NHL hat-trick. Jonathan Toews, who himself had a career-high five-point game, recorded the primary assists on all three of Sharp's goals. Sharp would finish the season with 33 goals and 36 assists. He scored one goal during the Blackhawks' first round exit to the Phoenix Coyotes in the 2012 playoffs.

During the 2012–13 NHL lockout, Sharp remained in Chicago, while many of his teammates started playing for European leagues. He spent time with his then nine-month-old daughter, and was involved in Gillette's "My City is My Gym" fitness program as a spokesperson. During the shortened NHL season, when play resumed in 2013, Sharp played 28 games, recording 6 goals and 14 assists and a plus-minus rating of +8. On December 27, 2013, in a 7–2 win against the Colorado Avalanche, Sharp scored his third career NHL hat-trick. Four games after, in a 5–3 win against the New Jersey Devils on January 3, 2014, he scored his fourth NHL hat-trick. On January 7, 2014, he was named to the Canadian Olympic team for the 2014 Winter Olympics in Sochi.

He would win his third Stanley Cup championship with the Blackhawks in 2015. He scored five goals with 10 assists during the playoffs.

Dallas Stars
On July 10, 2015, due to salary cap issues, Sharp and Blackhawks defenceman Stephen Johns were traded to the Dallas Stars in exchange for Trevor Daley and Ryan Garbutt.

On December 22, 2015, in the first matchup against his former Blackhawks, he tallied a two-point performance, adding a goal and an assist in a 4–0 victory. He played in 76 games in his first year in Dallas, recording 20 goals and 35 assists.

Return to Chicago
On July 1, 2017, Sharp signed a one-year contract with the Chicago Blackhawks for the 2017–18 season. Sharp accepted a pay cut, earning a $800,000 base salary with $200,000 in potential bonuses, to return to Chicago. The Blackhawks named Sharp an alternate captain for their final home game of the season and honored him after the game. Sharp announced his intention to retire after his final game, commenting, "I think I've known what I wanted to do for a long period of time here, and it's never easy... But I think I'm just ready to take that next step in my life — and looking forward to it."

Post-retirement
In October 2018, Sharp joined NBC Sports Chicago as a studio analyst. Sharp joined NBC Sports as a guest analyst for its coverage of the Stanley Cup Playoffs just 10 days after his retirement. After Sharp's part-time work as a studio analyst for NBC Sports during the 2018-19 NHL season, the network announced on September 25, 2019, it had added Sharp to its team of full-time studio analysts. Sharp later left NBC Sports to join NBC Sports Chicago for Chicago Blackhawks telecasts in 2021, and he later share the role with Troy Murray as the team's TV color commentator, replacing Eddie Olczyk.

Sharp joined the University of Vermont men's ice hockey coaching staff in the Fall of 2021.

Personal life

Sharp was born in Winnipeg, Manitoba, to Ian and Ruth Ann Sharp. He has an older brother, Chris, who currently lives in Calgary, Alberta. Relocating several times in his life, Patrick left his native Manitoba and relocated to Calgary as a child and then moved to Thunder Bay in 1990 at age nine. Patrick lived in Thunder Bay for the rest of his childhood. He was educated and attended local public schools in Calgary and Thunder Bay before settling in Burlington, Vermont, in the United States, to attend the University of Vermont. Sharp's parents remain in Thunder Bay and live on Lake Superior. In December 2009, Sharp was inaccurately announced as "Chicago's Sexiest Athlete" by Victoria's Secret, which then named Derrick Rose of the Chicago Bulls the winner, citing an "internal error".

Sharp was married in July 2010 to his longtime girlfriend Abby, whom he met while attending college in Vermont. Their wedding was held in Watch Hill, Rhode Island. Sharp's Blackhawks teammate Patrick Kane was among those in attendance. The couple's first daughter was born in December 2011, and their second daughter was born in October 2013. In early 2011, Sharp was featured on the cover of Chicago magazine in its "50 Most Beautiful Chicagoans" story.

Career statistics

Regular season and playoffs
Bold indicates led league

International

Awards and honours

References

External links

 
 
 
 

1981 births
Canadian ice hockey centres
Chicago Blackhawks players
Dallas Stars players
Ice hockey people from Ontario
Ice hockey players at the 2014 Winter Olympics
Living people
Medalists at the 2014 Winter Olympics
National Hockey League All-Stars
Olympic gold medalists for Canada
Olympic ice hockey players of Canada
Olympic medalists in ice hockey
Philadelphia Flyers draft picks
Philadelphia Flyers players
Philadelphia Phantoms players
Sportspeople from Thunder Bay
Ice hockey people from Winnipeg
Stanley Cup champions
Thunder Bay Flyers players
Vermont Catamounts men's ice hockey players